The Nair Brigade was the army of the erstwhile kingdom of Travancore in India. Nairs were a  warrior community of the region. The personal bodyguard of the king Marthanda Varma (1706–1758) was also called Thiruvithamkoor Nair Pattalam (Travancore Nair Army). The Travancore army was officially referred as the Travancore Nair Brigade in 1818.

In the early years, only Nairs were admitted into this brigade. Later, the unit was expanded and several sub-units were formed. The name Nair Brigade remained unchanged, even following the admittance of non-Nairs. The headquarters of the brigade was in Thiruvananthapuram (Trivandrum).

History

The army of Travancore was modernised by Marthanda Varma, who is known as "the maker of modern Travancore".The first Commander in Chief of his army was Kumaraswamy Pillai, who was a veteran soldier. Thanu Pillai, brother of then Dalawa Arumukham Pillai was made the Lieutenant Commander. He defeated the Dutch army with the Travancore army in 1741 at the Battle of Colachel and captured the Dutch commander Captain Eustachius De Lannoy.
Marthanda Varma agreed to spare the Dutch captain's life on the condition that he joined his army and trained his soldiers on modern lines.

The Travancore army was reorganised as the Travancore Nair Brigade in 1818. The Travancore Army was considered a part of the Indian State Forces from 1935. The units were known as the First, Second and Third Travancore infantry. The State Forces consisted of infantry units, the State Forces Artillery, the Travancore Training Centre, the Sudarsan Guards and the State Forces Band. With the integration of the State into the Indian Union, the Nair Brigade was integrated into the Indian Army as the 9th Battalion Madras Regiment (1st Travancore) and the 16th Battalion of the Madras Regiment (2nd Travancore) in 1954.

Strength 
The Army of Travancore was very strong during the 1700s. Later, after 1809 with the strengthening of English East India Company, and with Travancore signing a treaty handing over defense to the Company's army, the Nair Brigade headcount was reduced to 700 soldiers without arms and discipline, which was later increased to 1200 in number by request of then resident queen of Travencore,  Gowri Parvati Bayi in 1819. 

The total strength of Travancore Nair Army in 1945 was 4,082 men, of which 84 were officers and 132 were JCOs. A part of this force (those within medical categorization 'A') were absorbed into the Indian Army (Travancore - Cochin unified forces), while the remaining forces were disbanded. After the unification of Travancore and Cochin forces, Trivandrum was declared as the headquarters of the unified command. Major General V.N. Parameswaran Pillai, the GOC of the Travancore Nair army, became the commandant of the unified forces. The unified force was divided into five infantry battalions (Travancore - I, II, III and IV, Cochin I). The unification took place under Major General V.N. Parameswaran Pillai of Travancore and Lt Col G.S. Subbiah of Cochin on 20 May 1949. Finally the forces unified Travancore-Cochin forces were either disbanded or absorbed into the Indian Army and Major General V.N. Parameswaran Pillai was allowed to retire.

The first group of State Forces of Cochin Kingdom was also called as the Nair Brigade in 1940. The Brigade's name was changed in 1945 to Cochin State Forces by Kerala Varma and allowed non-Nairs also to be admitted into his army. Following the integration of Travancore Army with the Indian Forces, the Pazhavangadi Ganapathi Temple in Thiruvananthapuram which the Brigade maintained and owned was likewise transferred to the Indian Army.

Ranks of the Nair Brigade

See also
 History of Thiruvananthapuram
 Battle of Colachel
Battle of Nedumkottta
 9th Battalion Madras Regiment
Pazhavangadi Ganapathy Temple
Carnatic Brigade

References

pdf Digital book

Kingdom of Travancore
Military history of India
Military units and formations of the princely states of India
Nair